Jo Ye Sin (hangul:조예신) (born 1970) is a Korean voice actor.

She joined the Munhwa Broadcasting Corporation's voice acting division in 1993.

Roles

Broadcast TV
Chokomi(MBC)
Miracle Girls(Korea TV Edition, MBC)

Movie dubbing
The Mask of Zorro(replacing Catherine Zeta-Jones, Korea TV Edition, MBC)
Terminator(replacing Linda Hamilton, Korea TV Edition, MBC)

See also
Munhwa Broadcasting Corporation
MBC Voice Acting Division

Homepage
MBC Voice Acting Division Jo Ye Sin Blog(in Korean)

South Korean voice actresses
Living people
1970 births